The Elder Son may refer to:

 The Elder Son (1976 film), a Soviet two-part television drama film
 The Elder Son (2006 film), a comedy-drama film